John Wesley Swain (born September 4, 1959) is a former American football cornerback in the National Football League. Swain was drafted out of the University of Miami by the Minnesota Vikings in the fourth round in the 1981 NFL Draft. He played a total of 7 seasons in the NFL for the Vikings, the Pittsburgh Steelers, and the Miami Dolphins. He currently serves as a Uniform Inspector for the NFL. Swain is also the current NFL Heads Up Youth Ambassador for the state of Minnesota where he helps young football players to play the game better and safer through education, coaching certifications, and teaching proper playing techniques.

He is the Founder and Executive Director of the Next Level Foundation, a non-profit created to promote educational programs and events that are designed to provide family support and to raise the educational levels of students in Minnesota and other areas of the country including members of the minority community, who are substantially unemployed, underemployed, or those whose income is below the federal poverty guidelines; to foster and promote interest and concern for the problems of youth so educational and economic opportunities may be expanded. Through the Next Level Foundation he provides football camps, athletic development programs, after school motivational programs, and scholarships to under served youth in Minnesota.

External links
Stats at databasefootball.com
Playing It Smart Heads Up Fotball Program Teaching
Where Are They Now John Swain
Former Vikings CB John Swain Hosts Heads Up Clinic For Coaches
John Swain Steelers Cornerback

1959 births
Living people
Players of American football from Miami
American football cornerbacks
Miami Hurricanes football players
Minnesota Vikings players
Miami Dolphins players
Pittsburgh Steelers players
National Football League replacement players